The 2017 Boyd Gaming 300 was the third stock car race of the 2017 NASCAR Xfinity Series season and the 22nd iteration of the event. The race was held on Saturday, March 11, 2017, in North Las Vegas, Nevada at Las Vegas Motor Speedway, a 1.5 miles (2.4 km) permanent D-shaped oval racetrack. The race took the scheduled 200 laps to complete. At race's end, Joey Logano, driving for Team Penske, would hold off the field on the final restart with four to go to complete a dominating run. The win was Logano's 28th career NASCAR Xfinity Series win and his first and only win of the season. To fill out the podium, Kyle Larson of Chip Ganassi Racing and Daniel Suárez of Joe Gibbs Racing would finish second and third, respectively.

Background 

Las Vegas Motor Speedway, located in Clark County, Nevada outside the Las Vegas city limits and about 15 miles northeast of the Las Vegas Strip, is a 1,200-acre (490 ha) complex of multiple tracks for motorsports racing. The complex is owned by Speedway Motorsports, Inc., which is headquartered in Charlotte, North Carolina.

Entry list 

 (R) denotes rookie driver.
 (i) denotes driver who is ineligible for series driver points.

Practice

First practice 
The first practice session was held on Friday, March 10, at 1:00 PM PST, and would last for 55 minutes.

Second and final practice 
The second and final practice session, sometimes referred to as Happy Hour, was held on Friday, March 10, at 3:00 PM PST, and would last for 55 minutes.

Qualifying 
Qualifying would take place on Saturday, March 11, at 10:05 AM PST. Since Las Vegas Motor Speedway is under 2 miles (3.2 km), the qualifying system was a multi-car system that included three rounds. The first round was 15 minutes, where every driver would be able to set a lap within the 15 minutes. Then, the second round would consist of the fastest 24 cars in Round 1, and drivers would have 10 minutes to set a lap. Round 3 consisted of the fastest 12 drivers from Round 2, and the drivers would have 5 minutes to set a time. Whoever was fastest in Round 3 would win the pole.

Three drivers failed to qualify: Morgan Shepherd, Mike Harmon, and Josh Bilicki.

Full qualifying results

Race results 
Stage 1 Laps: 45

Stage 2 Laps: 45

Stage 3 Laps: 110

Standings after the race 

Drivers' Championship standings

Note: Only the first 12 positions are included for the driver standings.

References 

2017 NASCAR Xfinity Series
NASCAR races at Las Vegas Motor Speedway
March 2017 sports events in the United States
2017 in sports in Nevada